Tetradecylthioacetic acid (TTA) is a synthetic fatty acid used as a nutritional supplement.

TTA acts as a peroxisome proliferator-activated receptor alpha (PPARα) agonist and increases mitochondrial fatty acid oxidation in vitro.  In rodent studies, TTA has been reported to have other activities such as reducing inflammation and preventing high fat diet induced adiposity and insulin resistance.

In human clinical study, there have been mixed observations in preliminary studies.  One Phase I study showed no significant changes in the blood lipids or free fatty acids and another showed that TTA attenuates dyslipidemia in patients with type 2 diabetes mellitus.

References

Fatty acids
Thioethers
PPAR agonists